The 1996 Wales rugby union tour of Australia was a series of matches played in May and June 1996 in Australia by the Wales national rugby union team.

Results 
Scores and results list Wales' points tally first.

See also
 History of rugby union matches between Australia and Wales

References

1996 rugby union tours
1996
1996
1995–96 in Welsh rugby union
1996 in Australian rugby union
History of rugby union matches between Australia and Wales